José Lloréns Echevarría (1843 – 8 July 1920) was Mayor of Ponce, Puerto Rico, for three days, from 8 November 1898 to 10 November 1898.

Early years
Lloréns Echevarría was the son of José Lloréns Robles and Severiana Echevarría Quintero. He was director of the paper El Autonomista.

Mayoral term
Due to the American Government centralizing the insular government in San Juan after the invasion of the Island, the American military governor of Puerto Rico at the time, Major General Guy Vernon Henry, not trusting his loyalty to the new American government in Puerto Rico, removed Lloréns Echevarría as mayor of Ponce and installed Luis Porrata Doria on 11 November 1898.

Upon the governor's pronunciation a large number of Municipal Council members resigned their posts: José Lloréns Echevarría himself, Ulpiano Colom, Pedro J. Rosaly, Lucas P. Valdivieso, Antonio Morales, Baudilio Rabbaine, don Perez, Pedro J. Fournier, Antonio Arias, Emilio Cortada, Eugenio Morales, Fernando Vendrell, Carlos Felix Chardón, Alejandro Albizu, Deodoro Rivas, Antonio Mayoral, and Ramon E.  Gadea, disapproving of the new mayor, all resigned their posts.  In response, the governor named Luis Porrata Doria, Manuel Zaldo, Francisco Becerra, Jose Vidal Vilaret, Julio Bernard, Julio Rivera, Elias Concepcion, Jose Pou Carreras, Jose Usera, Jose Ramon Gonzalez, Rodulfo del Valle, Adolfo Cabrera, Miguel Hernandez, Herminio Armstrong, Santiago Fores, Pedro Auffant, Antonio Perez Guerra, Agustin Arce, Francisco Ruiz Porras.

Later years and death
After leaving his post as mayor, he worked as Municipal Council clerk during the mayoral administrations of Albert Myer, Pedro Juan Rosaly, Jose de Guzman Benitez, Enrique Chevalier, and Manuel V. Domenech, that is, from 1899 to 1904. In 1902, he was one of eight directors of El Águila de Puerto Rico, a newspaper in Ponce. Lloréns Echevarría died on 8 July 1920 and was interred at Cementerio Civil de Ponce.

See also

 List of mayors of Ponce, Puerto Rico
 List of Puerto Ricans

Notes

References

Further reading
 Imposing Decency: The Politics of Sexuality and Race in Puerto Rico, 1870-1920, by Eileen J. Suarez Findlay. Duke University Press. 1999.
 Fay Fowlie de Flores. Ponce, Perla del Sur: Una Bibliográfica Anotada. Second Edition. 1997. Ponce, Puerto Rico: Universidad de Puerto Rico en Ponce. p. 263. Item 1319. 
 Ana Mercedes Santiago de Curet. "Contrapunto boricua: Ponce y San Juan and te la llegada de los americanos." La nación soñada: Cuba, Puerto Rico y Filipinas ante el 98; Actas del Congreso Internacional celebrado en Aranjuez del 24 al 28 de abril de 1995. pp. 559-566. Aranjuez, España: Doce Calles. 1996. (Colegio Universitario Tecnológico de Ponce, CUTPO).
 Fay Fowlie de Flores. Ponce, Perla del Sur: Una Bibliográfica Anotada. Second Edition. 1997. Ponce, Puerto Rico: Universidad de Puerto Rico en Ponce. p. 264. Item 1320. 
 Ana Mercedes Santiago de Curet. "La reacción de Ponce a la ocupación americana: 1898." Revista del Instituto de Cultura Puertorriqueña. Año 90 (Octubre-Diciembre 1985.) pp. 9-16. (Colegio Universitario Tecnológico de Ponce, CUTPO / PUCPR).
 Fay Fowlie de Flores. Ponce, Perla del Sur: Una Bibliográfica Anotada. Second Edition. 1997. Ponce, Puerto Rico: Universidad de Puerto Rico en Ponce. p. 319. Item 1600. 
 Reglamento para el cuerpo de la policía municipal de Ponce, tal como resulta de las ordenanzas números 104 y 136 del Consejo Municipal de dicha ciudad, aprobada por el alcalde [Antonio Arias (José Lloréns Echevarría, secretario)] en 9 de mayo de 1903. Ponce, Puerto Rico: Tipografía Baldorioty, 1903. (Universidad de Puerto Rico, Rio Piedras) 

Mayors of Ponce, Puerto Rico
Year of birth uncertain
Burials at Cementerio Civil de Ponce
1843 births
1920 deaths